Salah Rekik (born 5 July 1965) is a Tunisian judoka. He competed in the men's half-middleweight event at the 1992 Summer Olympics.

References

External links
 

1965 births
Living people
Tunisian male judoka
Olympic judoka of Tunisia
Judoka at the 1992 Summer Olympics
Place of birth missing (living people)
African Games medalists in judo
African Games gold medalists for Tunisia
African Games silver medalists for Tunisia
African Games bronze medalists for Tunisia
Competitors at the 1987 All-Africa Games
Competitors at the 1991 All-Africa Games
Competitors at the 1995 All-Africa Games
20th-century Tunisian people
21st-century Tunisian people